Schwartziella is a genus of minute sea snails, marine gastropod mollusks or micromollusks in the family Zebinidae.

Species
 Pandalosia delicatula Laseron, 1956
 Pandalosia ephamilla (R. B. Watson, 1886)
 Pandalosia minuta (G. Nevill & H. Nevill, 1874)
 Pandalosia oceanica Laseron, 1956
 Pandalosia subfirmata (O. Boettger, 1887)
 Pandalosia subulata Laseron, 1956
 Pandalosia viticula (Laseron, 1956)
Synonyms
 Pandalosia darwinensis Laseron, 1956: synonym of Pandalosia subfirmata (O. Boettger, 1887) (junior synonym)
 Pandalosia excelsis Laseron, 1956: synonym of Pandalosia subfirmata (O. Boettger, 1887) (junior synonym)
 Pandalosia mizunamiensis Itoigawa & Nishimoto, 1984: synonym of Pandalosia ephamilla (R. B. Watson, 1886)
 Pandalosia obtusa Laseron, 1956: synonym of Pandalosia subfirmata (O. Boettger, 1887) (junior synonym)

References

 Laseron, C. F. (1956). The families Rissoinidae and Rissoidae (Mollusca) from the Solanderian and Dampierian zoogeographical provinces. Australian Journal of Marine and Freshwater Research. 7 (3): 384-484.
 Bandel K. 2006. Families of the Cerithioidea and related superfamilies (Palaeo-Caenogastropoda; Mollusca) from the Triassic to the Recent characterized by protoconch morphology – including the description of new taxa. Paläontologie, Stratigraphie, Fazies (14), Freiberger Forschungshefte, C 511: 59-13
 Faber, M. & K. Kaiser. (2015). The Rissoinidae of Île Clipperton in the tropical eastern Pacific (Mollusca. Gastropoda). Miscellanea Malacologica. 7, 19-23.

Zebinidae
Gastropod genera